"Maneater" is a song by Canadian singer Nelly Furtado from her third studio album, Loose (2006). The song was written by Furtado, Jim Beanz, and its producers Timbaland, Danja. It was released to mainstream radio in the United States in July 2006. The song's musical style and production were inspired by the Hall & Oates song of the same name and other music from the 1980s.

The song received positive reviews from music critics, with most comparing the song to Madonna and Depeche Mode songs from the 1980s. Outside North America, "Maneater" became one of Furtado's most popular singles, topping the charts in the United Kingdom and peaking within the top ten of the charts across much of Europe and Australia. The song became a club hit in North America but was less commercially successful than the lead single "Promiscuous".

The accompanying music video was filmed by American director Anthony Mandler in Los Angeles. In the United States, the video premiered on Yahoo! Music on 6 September 2006, and was given a "First Look" on MTV's Total Request Live on 8 September. The song was included on the setlist for Furtado's third tour Get Loose Tour.

Writing and recording
"Maneater" was one of the first songs Furtado and Timbaland worked on in the Hit Factory Criteria recording studios in Miami, Florida. Furtado has described the song as an analogy of how she incorporated the "creative energy" of Timbaland and his production crew into Loose. When making the album, Furtado and Timbaland were influenced by the work of musicians from the 1980s such as the Talking Heads, Blondie, Madonna, the Police, and Eurythmics. Final production of the track was delayed after a speaker caught fire in the studio control room. Furtado has also confirmed there was a fire in the studio when she was laying down the track, revealing it left her incredibly spooked. She feared something about the sound of the music had caused the flames, and for a while was too scared to work on it, Furtado also said "actually we were scared of the beat. We felt like it had the devil in it, or something. We put it away for a few weeks, until we had the courage to play it again. It was life-threatening! Someone almost got first-degree burns".

Furtado has characterized "Maneater" as "a 'couture pop' song", explaining that it is "in your face and very fashionable, stylistic and of-the-moment." In an interview with MTV News, she compared it favorably to eating too much cheesecake: "It's got a crazy loud beat, and the vocals are bitchy and loud. A lot of people say it sounds like Peaches, because of the delivery, the spooky vocals."

Furtado recorded a remix of "Maneater" with rapper Lil Wayne, which was featured in a Timbaland's compilation album Remix & Soundtrack Collection. The instrumental of this version was also used during many television performances of "Maneater". In Australia, the CD was released in two formats, although one version (the international single) had an extremely limited run and was not widely available. The Australia-exclusive "Maneater" CD single includes a cover of Gnarls Barkley's "Crazy" recorded on BBC Radio 1's Live Lounge program, on which "Maneater" was covered three times, by pop punk band Panic! at the Disco, dance music duo Basement Jaxx and rock band Boy Kill Boy, whose cover was released on the album Radio 1's Live Lounge.

Music structure and composition
"Maneater" is an uptempo song that combines 1980s electro synths and a more dance-oriented beat. The uptempo song has prominent rock and synthpop influences and is lyrically related to how people become "hot on themselves" when dancing in their underwear in front of a mirror. She stated: "[It] truly has a life of its own; it makes you move." Media sources compared it to the 1982 Hall & Oates single of the same name, which Furtado has cited as an influence on the song.
The song has a dance tempo and is composed in the key of B flat minor.
Maneater has a basic chord progression of Gb-Fm-Ab-Bbm

Critical reception
"Maneater" earned acclaim from music critics. Rob Sheffield of Rolling Stone stated that while not a Hall & Oates cover, the song "bumps hard enough to qualify as a sequel, and that's high praise indeed." AllMusic reviewer Stephen Thomas Erlewine cited "Maneater" as a highlight of Furtado's makeover, but believed that no matter how much Furtado sings about sex, she does not sound sexy and does not "generate much carnal heat."

About.com's Bill Lamb gave the song 3.5 out of 5 stars, praising the "powerful thumping beat and insanely catchy chorus", but considering the song repetitive and more suitable for the dance floor than radio stations. IGN's review considered it too similar to British singer M.I.A.: "the blatant attempt to capitalize on [M.I.A.] that ultimately causes the track to crumble." The song was later ranked as the twentieth best single of 2006 at The Village Voices Pazz & Jop poll.

Chart performance
"Maneater" was made available as a download (via the Apple iTunes Store) on 22 May 2006. It was released on maxi CD as the album's first single outside North America on 26 May in Austria, Germany and Switzerland, and on 5 June in the United Kingdom and other European markets. It debuted at number eight on the UK Singles Chart the week before its physical release, and a week later (on 11 June 2006) it went to number one. "Maneater" was the seventh highest selling single in the UK in 2006, with 296,000 units sold. In early 2007, chart rules were changed to allow tracks not accompanied by physical singles to appear on the singles chart, and "Maneater" subsequently re-entered the top forty on downloads alone. The British Phonographic Industry (BPI) certified "Maneater" gold for shipments of 400,000 units.

The single became a hit elsewhere in Europe, reaching the top five in Austria, Switzerland, Germany, Ireland and Norway, the top ten in Belgium, Finland and the Netherlands and the top twenty in France. "Maneater" was released on U.S. national television at the Fashion Rocks event on 8 September 2006. It entered the Billboard Hot 100 at number sixty-two, the highest debut of the week, and peaked at number sixteen; it also reached the top twenty on Billboards Pop 100. "Maneater" reached number one on the Hot Dance Club Play chart, but it was not as commercially successful in the U.S. as the preceding single, "Promiscuous", which reached number one on all three charts. The single debuted on the Australia ARIA Singles Chart on 25 September and rose to the top five the following week, peaking in its seventh week at number three. The ARIA accredited "Maneater" as a gold single for selling over 35,000 copies.

In Canada, where "Promiscuous" topped the singles chart, "Maneater" reached number twenty-two on 23 November 2006 (its fifteenth week). Its underperformance was attributed to the limited release of the CD single, which had been sold through retailers as early as "Promiscuous".  "Maneater" was the second best-selling digital track of 2006 in Canada –  behind James Blunt's "You're Beautiful" – with 66,607 downloads. "Maneater" was nominated for a 2006 MTV Europe Music Award for Best Song. It was also awarded a 2007 NRJ Music Award for Best International Song.

Music video

The official music video was directed by Anthony Mandler. The video features former So You Think You Can Dance contestant Jamile McGee as a dancer. Furtado had to schedule extra practicing sessions for her own dancing in the video.

The video does not have a substantial plot and, per Furtado's request, focuses on simultaneously celebrating and parodying the "maneater cliché". It begins with Furtado searching for her runaway Great Dane, Toby, at night in a seemingly deserted industrial district of an unnamed city. She follows the dog to the basement of a dark, dilapidated building, where she encounters a silent crowd of people in the middle of what MTV News described as a "Fight Club-esque party". Furtado positions herself in the middle of the crowd and, as the initial beat of the song emerges, begins to dance with "a sense of abandon", according to Furtado. This serves as the catalyst for a dance party that continues as the song plays. Towards the end of the video, Furtado moves to the roof of the building and dances in front of the rising sun. In the end she leaves the party at dawn, finding her dog sitting at the stairhead near the exit. "I like to walk on the dangerous side of life", Furtado said of the filming of the video.

In the U.S., the video premiered on Yahoo! Music on 6 September 2006, and was given a "First Look" on MTV's Total Request Live on 8 September. It debuted on the show's top ten video countdown on 11 September and peaked at number nine, remaining on the countdown for three consecutive days. The video entered the MuchMusic Countdown in Canada in the week ending 22 September, and it peaked at number one in the week ending 8 December. At the 2007 MTV Video Music Awards, Furtado was nominated in the category of Female Artist of the Year for "Maneater" and "Say It Right".

Track listingsUS 12-inch vinyl "Maneater" (radio edit) – 3:17
 "Maneater" (album version) – 4:19
 "Maneater" (instrumental) – 4:19UK CD maxi single "Maneater" (radio version) – 3:18
 "Undercover" – 3:56
 "Maneater" (Waata House Mix) featuring Alozade – 4:26UK 12-inch vinyl "Maneater" (radio edit)
 "Maneater" (Waata House mix) featuring Alozade
 "Maneater" (a cappella)
 "Maneater" (instrumental)German CD single "Maneater" (radio version) – 3:18
 "Undercover" – 3:56German CD maxi single "Maneater" (radio version) – 3:18
 "Undercover" – 3:56
 "Maneater" (Waata House mix) featuring Alozade – 4:26
 "Maneater" (video)Australian CD maxi-single "Maneater" (radio version) – 3:18
 "Crazy" (Radio 1 Live Lounge Session) – 3:24
 "Maneater" (Josh Desi remix) – 4:27
 "Maneater" (video)

Credits and personnel
Credits adapted from the Loose liner notes.Technical Recorded at The Hit Factory in Miami, Florida
 Mixed at Thomas Crown Studios in Virginia Beach, VirginiaPersonnel'

 Nelly Furtado – vocals, songwriting, background vocals
 Danja – music, producer, drums, keyboards
 Timbaland – producer, music, background vocals
 Jim Beanz – additional lyrics, background vocals, vocal production
 Demacio "Demo" Castellón – engineering, mixing, recording
 Marcella "Ms. Lago" Araica – additional recording, additional mixing
 James Roach – second engineering
 Ben Jost – second engineering
 Kobla Tetey – second engineering
 Vadim Chislov – second engineering

Charts

Weekly charts

Year-end charts

Certifications

Release history

References

External links
 Lyrics

2006 songs
2006 singles
Canadian dance-pop songs
Music videos directed by Anthony Mandler
Nelly Furtado songs
Song recordings produced by Danja (record producer)
Song recordings produced by Jim Beanz
Song recordings produced by Timbaland
Songs written by Danja (record producer)
Songs written by Jim Beanz
Songs written by Nelly Furtado
Songs written by Timbaland
UK Singles Chart number-one singles
Geffen Records singles
Mosley Music Group singles